The Journal of Complex Networks is a peer reviewed academic journal of complex networks. It is published by Oxford University Press.
The journal was established in 2013, with Ernesto Estrada as its editor-in-chief.

References 

Oxford University Press academic journals
Mathematics journals